USS Sicard (DD-346/DM-21/AG-100) was a Clemson-class destroyer in the United States Navy following World War I. She was named for Montgomery Sicard.

History
Sicard was laid down on 18 June 1919 by the Bath Iron Works; launched on 20 April 1920; sponsored by Mrs. M.H. Sicard, daughter-in-law of Rear Admiral Sicard; and commissioned on 9 June 1920.

On 26 June, the ship joined Destroyer Squadrons, Atlantic Fleet at Newport, Rhode Island. She operated on the east coast and in the Caribbean and Panama Canal Zone areas until 1922, engaging in battle and torpedo practice and fleet maneuvers and receiving necessary repairs at the New York Navy Yard. On 20 January 1921, she transited the Panama Canal and participated in combined Atlantic and Pacific Fleet war games and maneuvers in the Pacific, cruising to Callao, Peru, and returning to the Atlantic on 24 February.

Arriving at the Brooklyn Navy Yard on 27 April 1922 from spring maneuvers in the West Indies, Sicard was repaired and fitted out for duty on the Asiatic Station. On 15 June, she proceeded to Newport, received torpedo equipment; and, on the 20th, got underway with her squadron for her new station, sailing via the Mediterranean Sea and the Indian Ocean. The squadron arrived at Chefoo, China, on 26 August, and joined the Asiatic Fleet, with which she operated for seven years, based at Chefoo and Tsingtao in the summer and Manila in the winter. She received periodic overhauls at the Cavite Navy Yard. She participated in fleet exercises and maneuvers, protected American interests in China, Japan, and the Philippines, and engaged in escort and patrol duty on the China Coast and on the Yangtze River during periods of unrest.

On 30 and 31 August 1923, when violent earthquakes destroyed a large part of the cities of Tokyo and Yokohama, Japan, the Commander in Chief of the Asiatic Fleet, Admiral Edwin Anderson, Jr., dispatched all available vessels to that area with emergency supplies to render assistance. Sicard arrived in Yokohama harbor on 11 September and acted as dispatch boat to Tokyo and transported refugees from the city. From 25 September to 3 October, she was stationed in Nagasaki harbor as relay ship, since all radio communications to Yokohama and Tokyo were out of commission. The prompt action of Sicard and other units of the Asiatic Fleet helped save thousands of lives and earned the thanks of the Japanese government. Between 26 April and 30 June 1924, Sicard again saw special duty, in connection with the flight of four United States Army airplanes around the world. The destroyer cruised from Hong Kong to Rangoon, Burma, and Calcutta, India, guarding the flight and maintaining radio communications. During the next few years, Sicard's patrols in Chinese waters became more frequent due to the fighting which accompanied Chiang Kai-shek and the Kuomintang prevailing over warlords. On 22 July 1929, having been relieved by another squadron, Sicard and her squadron sailed from Yokohama, Japan, for the United States and arrived at San Diego on 17 August.

In October 1929, Sicard joined Destroyer Squadrons, United States Battle Fleet, and for several years operated principally on the west coast of the United States, with periodic overhauls at the Mare Island Navy Yard. She engaged in fleet concentration problems and battle and torpedo practice; towed targets for submarines and air squadrons; performed plane guard duty and made Naval Reserve training cruises. During the period 15 February to 21 June 1930, Sicard made a cruise to the Atlantic with the Battle Fleet, participating in the United States Fleet concentration and Fleet Problem X in Caribbean waters and visiting New York and Hampton Roads for the Presidential Review on 20 May. She took part in fleet problems conducted in the Canal Zone and Caribbean area from 4 February to 15 April 1931 and in Hawaiian waters from 1 February to 22 March 1932. From 24 March to 1 October 1934, Sicard was attached to Rotating Reserve Squadron 20 at San Diego. On 1 October, she joined Destroyer Squadron 4 and continued operations with the Battle Force in the Pacific.

On 12 May 1935, while engaging in Fleet Problem XVI off Diamond Head, Oahu, Sicard was rammed by Lea (DD-118) and badly damaged. The ship was towed by Rail (AM-26) to the Pearl Harbor Navy Yard, where she received extensive repairs before resuming operations with her squadron in August.

World War II
In May 1937, Sicard entered the Pearl Harbor Navy Yard for conversion to a light minelayer; and, on 20 June, she was reclassified DM-21. Except for a brief trip to the west coast for repairs and training from 20 September to 20 December 1937, Sicard operated in the Hawaiian area through 1941, engaging in division tactics and training exercises, fleet problems and maneuvers, joint Army and Navy exercises, battle, torpedo and mining practice, and reconnaissance missions around Midway and outlying islands. She entered the Pearl Harbor Navy Yard on 21 November 1941 and was under overhaul there when the Japanese attacked on 7 December. The ship had ammunition only for her .30-caliber machine guns but aided in the defense of the base by sending men to help operate the guns of the cruiser New Orleans (CA-32) and the destroyer Cummings (DD-365).

On completion of overhaul on 28 January 1942, Sicard left Pearl Harbor for an antisubmarine patrol station southwest of Oahu, where she escorted ships within her area and searched for hostile submarines. Between 1 and 9 April, she helped lay a large defensive minefield at the French Frigate Shoals, some 500 miles northwest of Oahu; and, between 10 and 18 April, she set up a Marine radio and surveillance station at Eastern Island in the Midway group. On 19 June, Sicard sailed from Pearl Harbor with other light minelayers, picked up mines at Seattle, Washington; and, in July, laid a defensive minefield off Kodiak, Alaska. On her return to Hawaii on 27 July, she resumed her local patrol assignment. She sailed on 16 September for the Aleutian Islands to lay another minefield and conduct more patrols and then proceeded on 22 November to San Francisco for overhaul.

After completion of repairs on 22 December, Sicard participated in amphibious landing exercises off San Diego; and then sailed on 24 April 1943 from San Francisco with a convoy of troop transports for the assault on Attu in the Aleutians. Sicard was to have acted as a landing craft control vessel for the operation; but, on the night before the landing, she collided with the destroyer, Macdonough (DD-351), in a dense fog. Sicard towed McDonough into Adak, and then proceeded to San Francisco for repairs, which lasted to 29 July. She was more fortunate during the Kiska landings and successfully guided the waves of assault boats to the beach there between 15 and 18 August. She performed local patrol and escort duties in the Aleutians, and then escorted a convoy to Pearl Harbor, where she arrived on 15 September.

Sicard left Pearl Harbor on 24 September for a new area of operations, the Southwest Pacific. She escorted ships to Nouméa and Espiritu Santo, and then continued to Purvis Bay where she and her sisters, Gamble (DM-15) and Breese (DM-18), formed a fast mine-laying group. The group sortied on 31 October to plant an offensive minefield off Bougainville Island. Just as the group completed its mission and began to retire early in the morning of 2 November, it was illuminated by parachute flares from enemy aircraft. Soon a friendly cruiser force steamed by at high speed in the opposite direction and opened fire on an invisible enemy. Sicards group had unknowingly helped bring the opposing forces together for the Battle of Empress Augusta Bay.

Sicard with four other destroyer-minelayers, laid another minefield off Bougainville on 8 November; and, after brief convoy duty, the ship laid a third minefield off the Shortland Islands on 24 November. Between December 1943 and April 1944, she escorted convoys between Espiritu Santo, Guadalcanal, Purvis Bay, Noumea, Fiji, New Zealand, and Kwajalein. On 1 May 1944, she resumed her minelaying role and laid a field off Buka Island in two trips on 2 and 10 May. After additional convoy duty, the ship returned to Alameda, California, on 11 July 1944 for overhaul.

Sicard completed repairs on 20 September and, after refresher training, sailed for Pearl Harbor on 4 October. Following another period of upkeep from 10 October to 16 November, she commenced duty training submarines. She conducted daily exercises with submarines off Oahu until 9 January 1945, and then performed similar duties at Midway until 2 September 1945. During this period, she was reclassified a miscellaneous auxiliary, AG-100''', effective 5 June 1945. On completion of training duty, Sicard arrived at the Philadelphia Navy Yard for inactivation on 21 October.

Fate
She was decommissioned on 21 November 1945, struck from the Navy list on 19 December 1945, and sold on 22 June 1946 to Hugo Neu of New York for scrap.

Honors and awardsSicard received two battle stars for her World War II service.

Postscript
As of 2009, no other ship has been named USS Sicard''.

References

External links
USS Sicard Info

Clemson-class destroyers
World War II mine warfare vessels of the United States
World War II auxiliary ships of the United States
Ships built in Bath, Maine
1920 ships
Ships present during the attack on Pearl Harbor
Ships of the Aleutian Islands campaign